Stavro Stavri (1885-1955) was an Albanian diplomat and politician. He served as Albania's ambassador to Yugoslavia (1925) and Greece (1926-28). Stavri also served as a member of the Albanian Parliament for 3 terms.

References

Ambassadors of Albania to Greece
Ambassadors of Albania to Yugoslavia
Diplomats from Kavajë
Parliament members from Kavajë
1885 births
1955 deaths
People from Scutari vilayet